"Leben wir jetzt" (English: Now We Live) is a song recorded by German singer LaFee. The song was released as the second single of her fifth studio album Frei on 11 November 2011.

Production
The producer of "Leben wir jetzt" is David Bonk with the help of Peter Hoffmann. The songwriters are LaFee, Timo Sonnenschein and Jennifer Kästel.

Music video and chart history
"Leben wir jetzt" is the thirteenth song of LaFee's made into a music video. It did not successfully make the charts. In the music video LaFee is playing a role as a mother with her young children along with singing and dancing.

Track listing
German CD single
"Leben wir jetzt" – 3:15
"Ich bin (Acoustic Version)" – 3:04

Release history

References

2011 singles
LaFee songs
2011 songs
EMI Records singles